Loewen is a spelling variant of the word Löwen which means "lions" in German. This spelling is uncommon in Germany, Austria, and Switzerland (as in the most common German language dialects ö is used usually instead of oe, while in English ö and oe are the same thing) and a surname with this spelling is usually used by Mennonites or by Americans who Americanized their Löwen to Loewen. Notable people with the name include:
 Adam Loewen (born 1984), Canadian-American baseball player
 Bill Loewen (born 1930), Canadian entrepreneur, philanthropist, political activist and politician
 Chuck Loewen (born 1957), American football player
 Cynthia Loewen (born 1993), Canadian beauty pageant and 2014 Miss Earth Canada
 Darcy Loewen (born 1969), Canadian-American hockey player
 Gregory Loewen (born 1966), Canadian social philosopher
 James W. Loewen (born 1942), American sociologist
 Jocelyne Loewen (born 1976), Canadian voice actress
 John Loewen (born 1949), Canadian politician in Manitoba
 Raymond Loewen (born 1940), Canadian politician and business owner in British Columbia
 Rochelle Loewen (born 1979), Canadian broadcaster, glamour model and professional wrestler
 Royden Loewen (born 1954), Canadian History Professor and Chair in Mennonite Studies at the University of Winnipeg
 Todd Loewen (born 1966), Canadian politician in Alberta

See also
 Löwen (disambiguation)

Low German surnames
Russian Mennonite surnames